Anton Gindely (3 September 1829, Prague24 October 1892) was a Bohemian historian, a son of a Hungarian German father and a Czech mother, born in Prague. As a distinguished historian, Gindely has left number of valuable historical works, written in German and Bohemian.

The development of Gindely’s perspective on Bohemian history reflected his different personal trajectories through the tumultuous events that happened during the first half of 19th century. He studied in Prague and in Olomouc, and, after travelling extensively in search of historical material, became professor of history at the German Charles-Ferdinand University of Prague and archivist for Bohemia in 1862. During the same time, Gindely was entrusted with the control of the library of Prince George Lobkowitz, which brought him in close connection with the literary interests of the leading families of the Bohemian nobility. He principally occupied himself during the final years of Bohemian independence. He died in Prague.

Gindely's chief work is his Geschichte des dreissigjährigen Krieges (Prague, 1869–1880), which has been translated into English (New York, 1884); and his historical work is mainly concerned with the period of the Thirty Years' War. ‘Unity of the brethren’ was one of his focused areas, which was evolved out of a more radical Hussite Movement. This was included a two volume “History of the Bohemian Brethren” (1857–58).

Perhaps the most important of his numerous other works are:
 Geschichte der böhmischen Brüder (Prague, 1857–1858)
 Rudolf II. und seine Zeit (1862–1868)
 A criticism of Wallenstein, Waldstein während seines ersten Generalats (1886)
He wrote a history of Gabriel Bethlen in Hungarian, and edited the Monumenta historiae Bohemica. Gindely's posthumous work, Geschichte der Gegenreformation in Böhmen, was edited by T. Tupetz (1894).

References 

 Kamil Krofta: Antonín Gindely o české otázce r. 1879 a jeho poměr k rozdělení pražské university r. 1882. In 30 ČČH 1/1924, pp. 95–108.

External links
 History of the Thirty Years' War by Gindely | Hathi Trust Digital Library

1829 births
1892 deaths
Writers from Prague
People from the Kingdom of Bohemia
German Bohemian people
19th-century Czech historians
Czech people of Hungarian descent
People of Hungarian German descent
Palacký University Olomouc alumni
Academic staff of Charles University
Academic staff of Palacký University Olomouc